"She Will" is a song by American rapper Lil Wayne featuring Canadian rapper Drake, released as the fourth single from the former's ninth studio album, Tha Carter IV. It was released as a digital download and was added to rhythmic radio stations on August 16, 2011 in the U.S. It was certified triple platinum by the Recording Industry Association of America for sales exceeding 3 million units on September 25, 2020.

Background
On August 7, 2011, a video of a recording session of the song was released with Lil Wayne previewing his verse to Drake on Skype. It was directed by DJ Scoob Doo, and was showcased on MTV News.  The song was to be titled "Maybe She Will", to be recorded by Drake and to feature a verse from Rick Ross, but after hearing the song, Drake asked Lil Wayne to have it.

Chart performance
On August 18, 2011, it debuted on the U.S. Billboard Hot R&B/Hip-Hop Songs chart at #48 and eventually ascended to #1. In its first week, it sold 255,000 digital copies, debuting at #3 on the Billboard Hot 100. This made it the highest-charting single from the album thus far, as well as Wayne's second highest-charting song as a lead artist, behind "Lollipop". The song also topped the Digital songs chart on the week of September 3, reaching 255,000 digital sales.

Track listing
 Digital single

Charts

Weekly charts

Year-end charts

Certifications

Release history

References

External links
"Making of "SHE WILL" Lil Wayne ft Drake off Carter IV dir:DJ Scoob Doo" on YouTube
"PT. 2 Making of "SHE WILL" Lil Wayne ft. Drake directed by DJ Scoob Doo" on YouTube

2011 songs
2011 singles
Lil Wayne songs
Drake (musician) songs
Cash Money Records singles
Songs written by Lil Wayne
Songs written by Drake (musician)
Songs written by T-Minus (record producer)
Song recordings produced by T-Minus (record producer)
Downtempo songs